Boules sports, including boule lyonnaise, pétanque and raffa, were introduced as World Games sports at the World Games 1985 in London.

Boule Lyonnaise

Men

Doubles

Progressive shooting

Precision shooting

Women

Doubles

Progressive shooting

Precision shooting

Pétanque

Men

Precision shooting

Doubles

Triples

Women

Precision shooting

Doubles

Triples

Raffa

Men

Doubles

Women

Doubles

External links
 World Games at Sports123 by Internet Archive
2005 World Games info system

 
Sports at the World Games
World Games